Bakhtier Farouk is an engineer, currently the J. Harland Billings Professor at Drexel University, and also a published author. He is a member of the American Society of Mechanical Engineers.

Education and academic career
Farouk earned his Bachelor of Science at the Bangladesh University of Engineering and Technology in 1975. He was employed as a lecturer in their Mechanical Engineering Department from 1975 to 1976, and then pursued graduate training with the Mechanical Engineering Department at the University of Houston, Texas in 1976, ultimately earning his Master of Science and Doctor of Philosophy from the University of Delaware in 1978 and 1981. Subsequently, hired by Drexel University's Mechanical Engineering and Mechanics department as an assistant professor, he advanced to the ranks of associate professor and professor, respectively, in 1987 and 1989, and was then appointed as Drexel's J. Harland Billings Professor of Mechanical Engineering in 2004.

References

Drexel University faculty
21st-century American engineers
Bangladesh University of Engineering and Technology alumni
University of Houston alumni
University of Delaware alumni
Year of birth missing (living people)
Living people